Beverly Jane Fry is an Australian ballerina.

Fry was born in Bexley, Kent, England but at an early age moved with her family to Melbourne, Australia. She trained with the Australian prima ballerina, Kathleen Gorham and with Gailene Stock.

She went on to become an international ballerina travelling the world in a performing career that lasted twenty years. Throughout her distinguished career she danced most of the major classical ballerina roles, and her interpretations have been recognized for their remarkable range of artistic and dramatic qualities and strong technical expertise.

Her repertoire includes: Odette/Odile in Swan Lake, Swanhilda in Coppélia, Aurora in The Sleeping Beauty, the Sylph in La Sylphide, Sugar Plum Fairy in The Nutcracker, the title role in Giselle, as well as the role of Myrtha Queen of the Wilis, Juliet in Romeo and Juliet, Taglioni in Pas de Quatre, Desdemona in Othello, Marguerite and Prudence in La Traviata, and the elder sister in Frank Staff's Transfigured Night which she performed at the London premiere.

She has also danced leading roles in many neoclassical and modern works by notable choreographers such as George Balanchine, Antony Tudor, Glen Tetley, Jose Limon and Istvan Herczog. In addition she has performed the Black Swan Pas de Deux at a gala performance in the Royal Albert Hall, London; Don Quixote and Le Corsaire Pas de Deux partnered by guest artists from both the Bolshoi and Kirov Ballet companies and in numerous galas throughout Britain with the "Russian and British Stars of Ballet". Among her partners were Vladimir Karakulev, Victor Barykin and Kirill Melnikov. Beverly Fry has appeared in two films (Nijinsky and La Sylphide). Also in successive years, 1989 and 1990, she was featured on the official Sadler's Wells Theatre Commemorative Calendar.

Fry has danced with a number of companies during her career including The Stuttgart Ballet, English National Ballet, Aterballetto (Italy) and London City Ballet where she remained as Principal Ballerina for 12 years. During this time she also made guest appearances with other companies throughout Europe. Over the years she has received personal coaching from many famous people namely, Dame Alicia Markova, Galina Panov, Rosella Hightower, Patrice Bart, Galina Samsova, Andre Prokovsky, Veronica Paeper, Glen Tetley and Scott Douglas.

In 1989 she was granted Australian citizenship under the clause, 'Residence outside Australia' as she was, 'Widely recognized as being of world standing in her field of endeavour, and engaged in cultural activities beneficial to the interests of Australia.'

Beverly Fry has performed in many galas in the presence of HRH Diana, Princess of Wales (Patron, London City Ballet) and was formally presented to her on every occasion. Following the death of Princess Diana in 1997, Beverly was invited by Buckingham Palace to be present in Westminster Abbey for her funeral. She was also a contributor on the Official BBC TV obituary programme Diana – The People’s Princess.

She has performed in China, Japan, the United States, Great Britain and Northern Ireland, the Channel Islands, France, Italy, Germany, Austria, Greece, Belgium, Hungary, Portugal, Iceland, Finland, Turkey, Jordan, Thailand, and the United Arab Emirates. She  has also danced at the International Ballet Festivals in Lille, Nervi, Budapest, the Carnival of Venice and Verona Festivals in Italy, the Sintra Festival in Portugal and the Jerash Festival in Jordan.

Her teaching qualifications include graduating Dux with High Distinction from The Australian Ballet School's Advanced Diploma of Dance Teaching and a registered Royal Academy of Dance (RAD) teacher. Her teaching credits include: Guest Teacher for The Australian Ballet School (ABS); Victorian College of the Arts; Australian Dance Theatre; Cecchetti scholars; Pineapple and Dance Works Studios, London; Temporary Custodian the Kathleen Gorham Ballet School; Adjudicator End of Year Assessments ABS and Guest Teacher at their inaugural Summer School in 1999.

Three years prior to retiring (from performing) she gave company class, rehearsals and individual coaching to both male and female dancers (soloists and principals) for London City Ballet, and in 1997 was Ballet Mistress to The Reanimators Company, London. More recently she has been on the Advisory Panel for the RAD and the Australian Institute of Classical Dance  (AICD) and given Master classes in Australia and Japan.

In January 1999 Beverly Jane Fry was appointed Director of Ballet for The National Theatre, Melbourne by invitation from the Board. Since then her talents as a choreographer have come to the fore choreographing and directing many ballets for the N.T.B.S. They include: a full-length Cinderella , a full-length Giselle and a new production of the ballet Carmen. Ballets created especially for children include: The Magic Toyshop, The Pied Piper of Hamelin (based on the Robert Browning poem), and What the Moon Saw, a captivating work with narrative, A Perfect Day and The Little Mermaid, a work which was 2 years in the making which she produced, directed, and choreographed. She also designed the sets and did the musical arrangement. Premiered in 2002, this work (based on the Hans Christian Andersen fairytale) has since been the highlight of many festivals throughout Victoria. In 2003, she produced and directed her own interpretation of the Bournonville ballet La Sylphide and in 2004 she staged a reworked version of her own original production of Carmen to include an exciting and fiery gypsy scene. She has subsequently staged reworked versions of her Cinderella 2005, Giselle 2006, La Sylphide 2007, and in 2008  choreographed, produced and designed a full-length Nutcracker with sold out seasons in 2008, 2010 and 2012.

References
website

Australian ballerinas
Year of birth missing (living people)
Living people
Australian Ballet School alumni
English emigrants to Australia
20th-century Australian dancers
21st-century Australian dancers
People from Melbourne